Haryana Public Service Commission, known commonly as HPSC is a government agency and topmost constitutional body of Government of Haryana, responsible for conducting Civil Services examinations and Competitive Examinations to select the eligible candidates for various  civil services and departmental posts.

History
The foundation of HPSC was led on 1 November 1966 when Haryana state was formed after the independence movement of India. It was originally established under the provisions of Punjab Reorganisation Act, 1966. Government of India Act 1935 authorized the state government to form state public service commission.

Functions
HPSC performs its functions as authorized by Act-1966 and 1935 provisions constitution of India. Its chairman is authorized to make independent decisions under the certain rules and regulations amended by the Government of Haryana and its state governor.

 Conducting written examinations and recruitment process of the eligible candidates.
 Conducting interviews and screening tests of eligible candidates.
 Conducting competitive and departmental examinations.
 To maintain and decide service rules.
 Advice to the Haryana Government.

Commission profile
HPSC consists 5 members and 1 chairman that are appointed or removed by the state governor. Their term of service is set to fixed period which starts from the date of appointment.

See also

 Administrative divisions of Haryana
 List of Public service commissions in India

References 

Government of Haryana
1966 establishments in Haryana
State agencies of Haryana
Government agencies established in 1966